Sparrow Hills is a hill on the right bank of the Moskva River in south-west Moscow, Russia where an observation platform, the main building of Moscow State University and parks are located.

Sparrow Hills may also refer to:
 Sparrow Hills (building), a residential complex in Moscow
 Vorobyovy Gory (Moscow Metro) or Sparrow Hills, a station of the Moscow Metro

See also
Sparrow Hill, a hill in Massachusetts